The Squirrel Meadow Guard Station is a ranger station in the backcountry of Targhee National Forest in Wyoming. The original facility was established in 1907, with the present structures built in 1934. The log cabin station is an example of a standard US Forest Service backcountry patrol structure.

The site comprises a log cabin and an outhouse. A second cabin belonging to the state of Wyoming is nearby, and while compatible in design, is not included in the historic designation. The cabin was built using Forest Service Standard Plans R4-7 (cabin) and R4-70 (outhouse).  It is one of only two R4-7 cabins in Wyoming. The cabin is a two-room structure with a kitchen at the west end, a living space at the east end, and a screened porch at the far east end. Wall and roof construction uses lodgepole pine logs. A galvanized roof has been installed over the original wood roof shingles. A well with a hand pump in front of the cabin dates to the 1980s. The stove in the kitchen area is a wood-burning cooking stove.  There is a wood-burning stove in the living area for heat.

The Squirrel Meadows Cabin is rented to the public as a visitor accommodation.

References

External links
 US Forest Service listing at recreation.gov
 at the National Park Service's NRHP database
Squirrel Meadows Guard Station at the Wyoming State Historic Preservation Office

Park buildings and structures on the National Register of Historic Places in Wyoming
Government buildings completed in 1934
Rustic architecture in Wyoming
Buildings and structures in Teton County, Wyoming
United States Forest Service ranger stations
National Park Service ranger stations
National Register of Historic Places in Teton County, Wyoming
1934 establishments in Wyoming